Chandalar Lake is a lake in Yukon-Koyukuk Census Area, Alaska, United States. It is located near, although not in, the Arctic National Wildlife Refuge.

References

Lakes of Alaska
Bodies of water of Yukon–Koyukuk Census Area, Alaska